Caitlin Leach (born 16 November 1996) is an English footballer who played in the goalkeeper position for Bristol City. She has represented England on the under-19 national team.

Playing career

Bristol City, 2016–present 
Leach signed with Bristol City in January 2016 ahead of the 2016 FA WSL season. She made 15 appearances for the team and helped secure a second-place result with a  record and promotion to FA WSL 1. During a match against rival Everton Ladies, Leach's stoppage-time penalty kick save helped seal the team's promotion to FA WSL 1. on the 5th of February 2018 it was confirmed that Leach had left the Women's Super League One club by mutual consent.

International 
Leach has represented England on the under-19 national team. Following her performance at the U-19 Euros, Leach was named to the squad of the tournament.

Honours 
 with Bristol City
 FA WSL 2 Runner-up: 2015

See also

References

Further reading
 Caudwell, Jayne (2011), Women's Football in the UK: Continuing with Gender Analyses, Routledge, 
 Grainey, Timothy (2012), Beyond Bend It Like Beckham: The Global Phenomenon of Women's Soccer, University of Nebraska Press, 
 Scraton, S., Magee, J., Caudwell, J. (2008), Women, Football and Europe: Histories, Equity and Experience (Ifi) (Vol 1), Meyer & Meyer Fachverlag und Buchhandel GmbH, 
 Stewart, Barbara (2012), Women's Soccer: The Passionate Game, Greystone Books, 
 Williams, Jean (2003), A Game for Rough Girls?: A History of Women's Football in Britain, Routledge,

External links 
 
 
 Bristol City player profile
 

1996 births
Living people
Women's Super League players
Bristol Academy W.F.C. players
English women's footballers
Women's association football goalkeepers